{|
{{Infobox Ship Image
|Ship image=Clipper ship 'New Era'.jpg
|Ship caption='New Era}}

|}New Era was a ship that wrecked on November 13, 1854, with the reported loss of about 150 lives, off of present-day Asbury Park, New Jersey, coincidentally at almost the identical location the SS Morro Castle ran aground in 1934 after a devastating fire that had killed 137 crew and passengers.

The journeyNew Era was built in Bath, Maine as an emigrant ship of 1328 tons in 1854 and set sail on this its first voyage on September 28. The ship was carrying nearly all German emigrants having sailed from Bremen, Germany with a final destination of New York. The crossing was difficult with 40 passengers being lost to cholera during the journey. It was later reported that New Era was a leaky ship with both crew and passengers required to man pumps during the voyage.

GroundingNew Era'' grounded in a dense fog in the morning hours of the 13 November with the reported loss of about 150 lives.

Memorial marker
Asbury Park founder James A. Bradley placed a memorial marker for the wreck in 1893; it was lost to sea shortly after. On September 15, 2012 an archeological search performed with ground penetrating radar failed to find the monument.

References

 WRECK OF THE SHIP NEW ERA 1854
- By Julius Friedrich Sachse
Published by The Pennsylvania German Society 1907

Shipwrecks of the New Jersey coast
Maritime incidents in November 1854
1854 ships